Dominic Inglot and Franko Škugor were the defending champions, but Škugor chose to compete in Barcelona instead. Inglot played alongside Rohan Bopanna, but lost in the quarterfinals to Andre Begemann and Ernests Gulbis.

Ken and Neal Skupski won the title, defeating Marcus Daniell and Wesley Koolhof in the final, 6–3, 6–4.

Seeds

Draw

Draw

References

External Links
 Main Draw

Hungarian Open (tennis)
Gazprom Hungarian Open – Doubles